Jawahar Navodaya Vidyalaya, Doda (or simply JNV Doda) is a model school in Doda district of Jammu and Kashmir, India. This school category, called as Jawahar Navodaya Vidyalayas are the schools for gifted students in India, established in every district of India. These schools are run by Navodaya Vidyalaya Samiti, New Delhi, an autonomous organization under the Ministry of Human Resource Development, Department of Education, Government of India. JNV Doda is a fully residential and co-educational school affiliated to Central Board of Secondary Education (CBSE), New Delhi, with classes from VI to XII standard. This school like other JNVs is specifically tasked with finding talented children in rural areas of India and providing them with an education equivalent to the best residential school system, without regard to their family's socio-economic condition.

Admission
Admission to the JNV Doda requires qualifying in an entrance exam, called as JNVST, designed, developed and conducted by NCERT earlier and now by the CBSE, except lateral admissions in the class IX and XI to the very limited seats held annually. JNV Doda is administered by Chandigarh region of the Jawahar Navodaya Vidyalaya regional center.  The test encompasses reasoning/mental ability skills, Maths, and Regional language. The school provides reservation as per mandate of Govt. of India, at least 75% selection of students from rural areas, maximum 25% from urban areas and fixed 33% to girl students. Applications to appear in the test are made freely available at the Vidyalayas and District Education Offices.  The JNV Samiti takes extensive care to make the applications available (and to communicate their availability through multiple media outlets) to far-flung rural districts, so as to properly serve this under-served population. Every year every JNV select about 80 most meritorious students. There is no admission fee and no re-admission fee however the non below poverty line and General category male students of Class IX to XII are charged 200 per month in welfare of Vidyalayas called Vidyalaya Vikas Nidhi.

Infrastructure
JNV Doda has a two-storey school building with IT facility available.

Locations

JNV Doda was established in 1986 and the campus was set up in Arnora, a village in block Ghat of Doda district. The same campus is still in use today.

Hostels
Unlike other JNVs, JNV Doda also hosts four hostels. Both boys and girls have separate hostels but have the same names. Students are divided into four houses, whose names may vary by location but generally the names of houses are Aravali, Nilgiri, Shivalik and Udaigiri which are named after the mountain ranges in India. The hostels are each divided into two sections, one for senior students (IX, X, XI XII standard) and other for junior students (VI, VII, VIII standard).
The separate hostels for girls also have the same criteria of division.

Cultural activities
Cultural activities are a key part of the JNV program.  JNV Doda also performs many cultural activities and has a small music hall where the students are taught to play different musical instruments.

Sports
JNV Doda gives great emphasis to sports. It provides facilities for handball, volleyball, kho-kho, badminton, kabaddi and cricket.  The daily schedule allots at least two hours a day toward sports or other play activities during the games period every evening. The campus also provides a gymnasium and multi-purpose room for indoor games.
Inter-school competitions are also yearly once at cluster, regional, national, and SGFI (Sports and Games Federation of India) level.

Scouting, guiding and NCC
JNV Doda also participates in NCC and Scouts and Guides. As part of NCC training, students of the JNV Doda attended several camps and excel themselves.

Migration
One of the important features of the JNV scheme is an exchange programme wherein students visit JNVs in different linguistic regions to promote understanding of the diversity and plurality of India's culture and its people. The aim of the exchange program is focused on national integration. According to the scheme, selected 30% of 9th class students are exchanged between JNVs of non-Hindi speaking region and Hindi speaking region, for one year and  students of two collaborated navodayas are taught language of their associated state as third language for four years, from class 6th-9th. JNV Doda has such exchange programme of migration of IXth class students with JNV Bareilly in UP.

See also
 List of Navodaya Vidyalayas
 Jawahar Navodaya Vidyalaya, Shopian

References

External links
 NVS Official Website
 All India JNV Alumni Committee Website

Doda
Schools in Jammu and Kashmir
1986 establishments in Jammu and Kashmir
Educational institutions established in 1986